Octavian Paler ( or ; July 2, 1926 – May 7, 2007) was a Romanian writer, journalist, politician in Communist Romania, and civil society activist in post-1989 Romania.

Biography
Octavian Paler was born in Lisa, Brașov County. He was educated at Spiru Haret High School in Bucharest. In the summer of 1944, just one week before graduating the 7th grade, he was forced to leave the school because of an argument with his uncle and Spiru Haret's school head master – George Șerban. Octavian Paler moved on to Radu Negru High School in Făgăraș, where he studied literature for his final examination. He graduated in 1945 with magna cum laude and outstanding results in philosophy, Latin and Greek. He sat the final examination in Sibiu in the same year.

Octavian Paler went on to study Philosophy and Law at the University of Bucharest.

He died of a heart attack on May 7, 2007 at the age of 80. He was buried with military honours in the Sfânta Vineri Cemetery in Bucharest. Conversations With Octavian Paler was published by Daniel Cristea-Enache just days after their passing.

Political activity
Paler was a substitute member in the Central Committee of the Romanian Communist Party from 1974 to 1979, and a member of the Great National Assembly for the Vaslui constituency from 1980 to 1985. However, he was persecuted by the Romanian secret service agency, the Securitate, because of his pro-western views and criticism of Romanian Communist Party, including Nicolae Ceaușescu. He was not allowed to leave his home and suffered restrictions in his artistic work.

After the Romanian Revolution and the fall of Ceaușescu in 1989, Paler continued his anti-communist activity as a founding member of the Group for Social Dialogue (Grupul de Dialog Social), together with Ana Blandiana and Gabriel Liiceanu amongst others. During his last years he was an intense critic of Romanian politicians and politics.

Journalism
The bulk of his career occurred during the Communist regime, as vice-president of the Romanian Radio and TV Broadcasting committee from 1965 to 1970, and president of the Romanian Journalists Council in 1976. He worked as a Senior Editor at the influential newspaper România Liberă from 1970 to 1983.

After 1989, Paler received public appreciation for his journalistic work and political activism and was appointed as the chief editor of România Liberă. He also published with Cotidianul and Ziua, and  made appearances on public TV discussing politics and morality.

Bibliography
 Umbra cuvintelor (Shadow Of Words) – 1970
 Drumuri prin memorie I (Egipt, Grecia) (Roads Through Memory I – Egypt, Greece) – 1972
 Drumuri prin memorie II (Italia) (Roads Through Memory II – Italy) – 1974
 Mitologii subiective (Subjective Mythologies) – 1975
 Apărarea lui Galilei (Galileo's Defense) – 1978
 Scrisori imaginare (Imaginary Letters) – 1979
 Caminante – 1980
 Viața pe un peron (Life On A Station Platform) – 1981
 Polemici cordiale (Cordial Polemics) - 1983
 Un om norocos (A Lucky Man) - 1984
 Un muzeu in labirint (A Museum in the labyrinth) - 1986 - (renamed by the author as "Eul detestabil"-"The detestable I" after 1995)
 Viața ca o coridă (Life As A Bullfight) - 1987
 Don Quijote în est (Don Quixote In The East) - 1993
 Vremea întrebărilor (Time Of Questions) - 1995
 Aventuri solitare (Solitary Adventures) - 1996
 Deșertul pentru totdeauna (Desert Forever) - 2001
 Autoportret într-o oglindă spartă (Self-Portrait In A Broken Mirror) – 2004
 Calomnii mitologice (Mythological Slander) – 2007
 Caminante.  (Caminante. A Mexican Diary And Counter-Diary) – 2010 (second edition)
 Eul detestabil (The Repugnant Self) - 2010
 Rugați-vă să nu vă crească aripi (Pray That You Don't Grow Wings) - 2010
 Definitions (poetry) 2011 also published into English by Istros Books London.

Trivia
Octavian Paler came in 93rd in a poll conducted by Romanian Television to find the "greatest Romanians of all time" in 2006.

See also
Conversations with Octavian Paler

References

1926 births
2007 deaths
People from Brașov County
University of Bucharest alumni
Romanian writers
Romanian newspaper editors
Members of the Great National Assembly
Romanian communists
Romanian anti-communists
Romanian dissidents
Romanian activists
Knights of the Order of the Star of Romania
Burials at Sfânta Vineri Cemetery